Mayumi Seiler (born November 14, 1963) is a Canadian-Austrian violinist born in Osaka, Japan, to Japanese/German parentage.

Education and career 
Starting the violin from the age of three, Seiler received her musical education at the Mozarteum University of Salzburg during the formative years of her childhood in Salzburg, Austria. Seiler is also the Artistic Director and founder of Via Salzburg Chamber Music, a Toronto-based chamber music organization.

Seiler has performed with numerous orchestras and conductors including Neville Marriner, Christopher Hogwood, Peter Oundjian, Sandor Vegh, and has been the featured soloist with orchestras such as the City of London Sinfonia, the Royal Philharmonic Orchestra, the Berlin Symphony, the Moscow Symphony Orchestra, the Hong Kong Philharmonic Orchestra, the Australian Chamber Orchestra, Camerata Salzburg, and the Toronto Symphony Orchestra. She was invited by violinist Ruggiero Ricci to perform with him in his final concert in Washington DC. Her performances as soloist with the UBS Verbier Festival Chamber Orchestra under the baton of Maxim Vengerov saw her perform at Toronto's Roy Thomson Hall, New York's Carnegie Hall, Amsterdam's Concertgebouw and Vienna's Musikverein and the Barbican in London.

Seiler has recorded many of the violin concertos and chamber repertoire for such labels as Virgin Classics, JVC Victor, Hyperion Records, and Capriccio (record label).

Recordings 
Mendelssohn, F.: Violin Concertos City of London Sinfonia. Label: Black Box.
Beethoven, Mendelssohn, Haydn: Violin Concertos City of London Sinfonia. Label: Virgin Classics.
Mendelssohn, F.: Violin Concertos City of London Sinfonia. Label: Virgin Classics.
Boccherini, L.: Sextets - Op. 23, Nos. 1, 3, 4, 6 Mayumi Seiler, Silvia Walch, Diemut Poppen, Richard Lester, Howard Penny. Label: Capriccio. January 1992

Sources

External links 
 

Japanese violinists
Musicians from Osaka
Musicians from Toronto
Mozarteum University Salzburg alumni
1963 births
Living people
21st-century Japanese musicians
21st-century Canadian violinists and fiddlers
Canadian classical violinists
Canadian women violinists and fiddlers